The Mysteries of Laura is an American police procedural comedy-drama television series developed by Jeff Rake and executive-produced Greg Berlanti and McG. The series premiered on September 17, 2014, on NBC. The Mysteries of Laura stars Debra Messing in the lead role of Detective Laura Diamond, a New York City homicide detective who balances her day job with off-duty hours as a single mother of two unruly sons. On May 8, 2015, The Mysteries of Laura was renewed for a second season of 13 episodes, which premiered on September 23, 2015. On November 9, 2015, NBC ordered three additional episodes for the second season. On May 14, 2016, NBC canceled the series after two seasons.

Series overview

Episodes

Season 1 (2014–15)

Season 2 (2015–16)

References

External links
 
 

Lists of American crime drama television series episodes
Lists of American comedy-drama television series episodes
Lists of mystery television series episodes